The World Group II was the second highest level of Fed Cup competition in 2011. Winning nations advanced to the World Group I Play-offs, and losing nations were demoted to the World Group II Play-offs.

Estonia vs. Spain

Estonian team
 Kaia Kanepi (WTA Singles #17, WTA Doubles #184)
 Anett Kontaveit (WTA Singles -, WTA Doubles -)
 Maret Ani (WTA Singles #527, WTA Doubles #241)
 Margit Rüütel (WTA Singles #442, WTA Doubles #1174)

Spanish team
 María José Martínez Sánchez (WTA Singles #28, WTA Doubles #12)
 Carla Suárez Navarro (WTA Singles Singles #66, WTA Doubles -)
 Anabel Medina Garrigues (WTA Singles #81, WTA Doubles #23)
 Nuria Llagostera Vives (WTA Singles #128, WTA Doubles #19)

Slovenia vs. Germany

Serbia vs. Canada

Sweden vs. Ukraine

References

See also
Fed Cup structure

World Group II